Nicholl is a surname. Notable people with the surname include:

 Andrew Nicholl (1804–1886), Irish artist
 Anthony Nicholl (died 1658), English politician
 Charles Nicholl (1870–1939), Wales international rugby union player
 Charles Nicholl (author), English historian and biographer
 Chris Nicholl (born 1946), Northern Ireland soccer player
 David Nicholl (neurologist), British neurologist
 David Nicholl (rugby player) (1871–1918), Wales international rugby union player
 Don Nicholl (1925–1980), British-American screenwriter and producer
 Donald Nicholl (1923–1997), British historian and theologian
 Edward Nicholl (1862–1939), British officer of the Royal Naval Reserve 
 Frederick Nicholl (1814–1893), English lawyer and cricketer
 Hazelton Nicholl (1882–1956), Royal Air Force officer 
 James Nicholl (1890 – c. 1955), Scottish footballer
 Jimmy Nicholl (born 1956), Canadian-Northern Ireland soccer player
 John Nicholl (disambiguation), multiple people
 Kate Nicholl (born 1988), Lord Mayor of Belfast
 Louise Townsend Nicholl (1890–1981), American poet and editor
 Margaret Suzanne Nicholl (1897–1983), American missionary 
 Peter Nicholl (born 1944), New Zealand economist
 Robert Nicoll (1814–1837), Scottish poet, sometimes spelled Nicholl
 Sam Nicholl (1869–1937), Major League Baseball player
 Terry Nicholl (born 1952) English football midfielder
 William Nicholl (1868–1922), rugby union footballer

See also
Nicholl–Lee–Nicholl, an algorithm named after Tina M. Nicholl and Robin A. Nicholl
Nicholl Head, a location in Antarctica
Nicholl Range, a mountain range in British Columbia, Canada

English-language surnames
Patronymic surnames
Surnames from given names